Veyo (also Glencove) is a census-designated place in western Washington County, Utah, United States, on the edge of the Dixie National Forest.

Description
The town lies along State Route 18 north of the city of St. George, the county seat of Washington County. Although Veyo is unincorporated, it has a post office with the ZIP code of 84782. The population was 483 at the 2010 census. One tradition says the community name is an acronym of virtue, enterprise, youth, and order; another says it combines verdure and youth. There is a town of Veyo in Spain that is also referred to as La Peña, which means "rocky outcrop".

Veyo became a distinct community from Gunlock in 1918.

Demographics

As of the census of 2010, there were 483 people living in the CDP. There were 193 housing units. The racial makeup of the town was 94.6% White, 0.8% American Indian and Alaska Native, 0.4% Asian, 0.2% Native Hawaiian and Other Pacific Islander, 2.3% from some other race, and 1.7% from two or more races. Hispanic or Latino of any race were 5.2% of the population.

Climate
According to the Köppen Climate Classification system, Veyo has a semi-arid climate, abbreviated "BSk" on climate maps.

See also

 List of census-designated places in Utah

References

External links

Populated places established in 1918
Census-designated places in Washington County, Utah
Census-designated places in Utah